Blackrock National Hurling Club is a Gaelic Athletic Association (GAA) club located on the southside of Cork City, Ireland. The club was founded in 1883 and is primarily concerned with the game of hurling. No other Cork-based GAA club has won more Senior County Hurling titles or All-Ireland Club Championships. The club is sometimes known as 'The Rockies'.

History
Blackrock Hurling Club was officially founded in 1883, one year before the foundation of the Gaelic Athletic Association itself. It is therefore the oldest hurling club in Cork. Until 1888 the club was known as Cork Nationals, when it changed its name to National Hurling Club of Blackrock, and later in the same year to Blackrock National Hurling Club.

Blackrock won eight of the first nine Cork Senior Hurling Championship titles and, in the early years of the All-Ireland Championship when the winning clubs represented the county, subsequently claimed the All-Ireland titles for Cork in 1893 and 1894. Blackrock once again claimed the All-Ireland hurling title for Cork in 1903, and were such a dominant force in Cork hurling that up until the 1930s, that many Blackrock players made up the county team in that period.

In subsequent years, Blackrock's dominance in Cork hurling was challenged by Glen Rovers and St. Finbarr's, however, Blackrock have consistently been at the top of the Roll of Honour. The team had a successful spell in the 1970s, winning All-Ireland Senior Club Hurling Championship titles in 1972, 1974 and 1979, along with five Munster titles in the same decade.

Blackrock's most recent Senior County Championship was in 2020 when they defeated Glen Rovers in the final.

Honours

All-Ireland Senior Hurling Championships: 5
1893, 1894, 1903, 1925, 1931
All-Ireland Senior Club Hurling Championships: 3
1972, 1974, 1979
Munster Senior Club Hurling Championships: 5
1971, 1973, 1975, 1978, 1979
Cork Senior Hurling Championships: 33
1887, 1889, 1891, 1893, 1894, 1895, 1897, 1898, 1903, 1908, 1910, 1911, 1912, 1913, 1920, 1924, 1925, 1927, 1929, 1930, 1931, 1956, 1961, 1971, 1973, 1975, 1978, 1979, 1985, 1999, 2001, 2002, 2020
Cork Junior Hurling Championships: 5
1895, 1901, 1910, 1931, 1947
Cork Under-21 Hurling Championships: 5
1976, 1977, 2012, 2014, 2015
Cork Minor Hurling Championships: 11
1963, 1966, 1967, 1968, 1969, 1974, 1994, 2009, 2011, 2012, 2013
Cork City Junior Hurling Championships: 7
 1931, 1947, 1949, 1970, 1973, 2003, 2013
Croke Cup Winners: 3
1903, 1910, 1913
Féile na nGael All Ireland Champions: 1
1971

Notable hurlers

This is a list of Blackrock players that have had championship successes with the club, or have played for the Cork senior hurling team.

Notable teams

See also
 St Michael's
 Blackrock–Glen Rovers hurling rivalry
 Blackrock–St Finbarr's hurling rivalry

References

External links
Blackrock Hurling Club Website

 
Gaelic games clubs in County Cork
Hurling clubs in County Cork